Burana may refer to:

 Burana, Kyrgyzstan, a village in Kyrgyzstan
 Burana Tower, a tower near the village in Kyrgyzstan
 Burana (drug), a nonsteroidal anti-inflammatory drug (NSAID) by Orion Corporation

See also
Burana Codex, Carmina Burana